Steven Henikoff is a scientist at the Fred Hutchinson Cancer Research Center, and an HHMI Investigator. His field of study is chromatin-related transcriptional regulation. 
He earned his BS in chemistry at the University of Chicago. He earned his PhD in biochemistry and molecular biology from Harvard University in the lab of Matt Meselson in 1977. He did a postdoctoral fellowship at the University of Washington. His research has been funded by the National Science Foundation, National Institutes of Health, and HHMI. In 1992, Steven Henikoff, together with his wife Jorja Henikoff, introduced the BLOSUM substitution matrices. The BLOSUM matrices are widely used for sequence alignment of proteins. In 2005, Henikoff was elected to the National Academy of Sciences.

References 

Year of birth missing (living people)
Living people
American biochemists
Harvard University alumni
Howard Hughes Medical Investigators
University of Chicago alumni
Fred Hutchinson Cancer Research Center people